Alburnus danubicus is a species of ray-finned fish in the genus Alburnus. It was known from coastal lakes in Romania and River Danube in Romania and Bulgaria. It is extinct and has not been recorded since 1943.

In 2019, a somewhat mysterious specimen was caught from River Danube, at Petrovaradin, Serbia. It might have been Alburnus danubicus, falsifying its status as an extinct species. Alternatively, it might have been an individual of Alburnus mento that moved down on the river very far from its native area in Upper Austria. The specimen was released alive after photography.

This species is found in temperate, benthopelagic, freshwater. Distinguishable by its branched anal-fin rays and lateral line scales.

References 

danubicus
Taxa named by Grigore Antipa
Fish described in 1909
Extinct animals of Europe
Fish extinctions since 1500